Magnano  is an Italian-language occupational surname, literally meaning locksmith.

The surname may refer to:

Greg Mangano (born 1989), American basketball player
Joy Mangano (born 1956), American inventor of the Miracle Mop
Rubén Magnano (born 1954), Argentine-Italian professional basketball coach
Silvana Mangano (1930–1989), Italian actress
Solange Magnano (1971–2009), Argentine model and beauty queen

See also: Magnani

Occupational surnames
Italian-language surnames